Jeffrey Holland may refer to:

Jeffrey Holland (actor) (born 1946), English television actor
Jeffrey R. Holland (born 1940), American educator and leader in The Church of Jesus Christ of Latter-day Saints
Jeffrey Scott Holland (born 1966), American artist and musician

See also
Geoffrey Holland (1938–2017), Vice-Chancellor of Exeter University